The 2006 Texas A&M Aggies football team completed the season with a 9–4 record.  The Aggies had a regular season Big 12 record of 5–3.

Schedule

Roster

Game summaries

The Citadel

Louisiana-Lafayette

Army

Louisiana Tech

Texas Tech

The game was close throughout the first three quarters, with the most notable play being a 95-yard kickoff return by A&M's Kerry Franks. When Tech was trailing by 3 late in the game, Graham Harrell threw what appeared to be an interception that would ice the game for the Aggies. However, video replay showed that the ball skipped off the ground before Mark Dodge corralled it, so the play was overturned. Tech went on to take the lead with less than a minute left on the clock. This close loss would prove to be devastating to A&M, as they would have won the Big 12 South had Dodge's interception been allowed. Dennis Franchione fell to 1–3 against the rival Red Raiders.

Kansas

Missouri

Oklahoma State

Baylor

Oklahoma

This game was Bob Stoops's 100th as head coach at Oklahoma; it was also the 25th meeting between the programs. The Sooners hold a narrow 15–10 lead in the series, though A&M has won five of the eight played in College Station. The Sooners have won their last four games while the Texas A&M Aggies came in with a four-game winning streak.

The two programs are very similar in their offensive philosophies.  Texas A&M came in averaging a very balanced 213.7 yards per game rushing and 209.1 passing while the Sooners averaged 178.4 yards on the ground and 204.8 through the air.  Oklahoma was surrendering an average of 36 fewer yards per game on defense.

The game started well for the Sooners. Allen Patrick had 101 yards on 14 carries and Oklahoma scored two touchdowns in the first quarter to A&M's one field goal. After Oklahoma failed to recover an early surprise onside kick, however, the Aggies closed the gap to 4 points with a scoring drive capped by a one-yard rumble from running back Jorvorskie Lane. The defenses stiffened in the second half and both teams had to settle for field goals in the third and fourth quarters. In his second risky call of the game, Stoops had the Sooners attempt to convert a fourth-and-inches with 1:29 left to play and the ball almost to the offense's 30 yard line.  The run by Thompson was successful but unnecessary as A&M was penalized for having too many men on the field and Oklahoma was able to run out the clock.

Paul Thompson had a disappointing day as he completed only three of his twelve passing attempts for a total of 39 yards. A&M's Stephen McGee was slightly better completing 8 of 18 for 63 yards, though he was picked off by Marcus Walker in the third quarter; Garrett Hartley kicked a field goal after the Sooners offense could not advance the ball after the turnover. The Aggies forced two fumbles of their own (one from Patrick and one from Thompson), but they were forced to punt after their own offense was also stymied. The player of the game was Allen Patrick; he finished the day with a career-high 173 yards on 32 carries and one touchdown, however, he suffered a sprained ankle during the last minutes of the game. Coach Wilson questioned whether he will be 100% for the next game. Texas A&M coach Dennis Franchione is now 0–4 against the Sooners.

On the day of the game, ESPN's College GameDay broadcast from College Station.

Nebraska

Texas

This game marked the 113th meeting between Texas and the Texas Aggies in college football and the game is part of a multi-sport rivalry called the Lone Star Showdown.  It is the Longhorns' longest-running rivalry and Texas lead the series 73–34–5, including the last six in a row.  During the week before the game, the Longhorns conducted their traditional Hex Rally while the Aggies had an off-campus version of their traditional Bonfire. and also staged a parade just prior to the game. The Longhorns announced that starting quarterback Colt McCoy, who was injured in the game against Kansas State, was cleared to play the game against the Aggies.

Since the series began in 1894 it has traditionally played on Thanksgiving Day or Thanksgiving weekend. The 2006 game marked the thirteenth straight game to be scheduled the day after Thanksgiving. The 2006 meeting was the first time in eight years that both teams entered the game with at least eight wins coming into the match-up. Going back to 1999 when UT lost the final three games of the season, the Longhorns had gone 87 games without losing back-to-back games. That was the longest active streak for any college or professional football team.

During 2006, the Texas A&M defensive coordinator was Gary Darnell who had been fired as defensive coordinator  at the University of Texas under John Mackovic.

The pre-game activities consisted of a military flyby performed by AH-1 Cobra helicopters from the Marine Light Attack Helicopter Squadron HMLA-773 from Atlanta. Texas A&M won the coin toss and deferred, Texas elected to receive, and Texas A&M chose to defend the south end-zone.  Kick-off was delayed while ABC side-line reporter Stacey Dales did her pre-game report from the north end-zone.

Texas's first drive of the game ended when Henry Melton was stopped on a fourth-and-one run at the Aggie eight-yard who was led with a big push by freshman Tony Portillo.(7 m) line.  The Aggies drove the ball the length of the field to score a touchdown, but missed on the extra point to leave the game at 6–0.

With about four minutes to play in the first half, McCoy connected with Limas Sweed for an apparent five-yard (5 m) touchdown pass.  However, Sweed was flagged for a "questionable" pass interference call.  According to the Austin American-Statesman the referee blew the call as replays showed that both players were involved in some "hand checking while the ball was in the air, but neither player appeared to push or be guilty of interference".  All three broadcasters working the game for ABC also spoke out against the penalty call.  In an ABC half-time interview, Mack Brown said “I thought it was a bad call,” but added “There’s nothing we can do about that. We should’ve done a better job on third down.”

Immediately after the penalty, Colt McCoy threw an interception near the Texas A&M goal line and the Aggies were able to run out the clock to take the 6–0 lead into half-time. The zero score marked the first time the Longhorns had been held scoreless in the first half of play since the 2004 season.

The only score in the third quarter was a rushing touchdown by Jamaal Charles, his seventh of the season.

In the fourth quarter, Texas A&M made a long-drive that took up nearly nine minutes. Texas A&M quarterback Stephen McGee had taken so many hard hits that he was throwing up during the game, but he managed to make an  touchdown run with 2:32 left to play.  A&M was unable to convert their two-point attempt after the touchdown.

With 1:21 seconds left in the game and Texas trailing 12–7, McCoy threw his third interception of the game.  Following the change of possession and sometime near the whistle signalling the end of the play on the field, Aggie Kellen Heard knocked McCoy to the ground as McCoy walked along the field unbuckling his chin strap.  Heard was ejected from the game as a result of the "cheap-shot late hit" and the Aggies were penalized fifteen yards (14 m).  McCoy was later quoted as saying that the tackle had not been a cheap shot.
Texas A&M's coach Dennis Franchione later apologized for what he called a "late hit" saying "We do not teach this type of play or condone it."  Texas held the Aggies to three-and-out and used all three of their time-outs in order to preserve game time.  Texas got the ball back with 48 seconds left in the game.

With 20 seconds remaining in the game, Colt was injured by a "vicious, stadium hushing tackle" as Aggies defensive end Michael Bennett connected with his helmet under McCoy's jaw just as McCoy released a pass.  Replays showed both on television and in the stadium revealed the hit included "helmet-to-helmet" contact which, if intentional, is illegal in NCAA football. No flag was thrown on the play. When the replay was shown in the stadium, the Longhorn fans erupted in boos before lapsing back into silence as McCoy lay on the ground for 10 minutes before being taken off the field on a cart.  Mack Brown said after the game "I didn't see it, but it sounded like 88,000 (fans) thought it was dirty."  Fellow Longhorn Selvin Young said he thought the hit was clean calling it a "textbook hit".  McCoy was taken to Brackenridge Hospital where he spent more than three hours undergoing an evaluation that included an X-ray, MRI, and a CAT scan.  Longhorns trainer Kenny Boyd said the injury was a severe pinched nerve in McCoy's neck.  Boyd said that McCoy was expected to make a full recovery, but no timetable was set for McCoy to return to play.  Months later, the Big 12 announced that their officials failed to make the correct call and that a late hit penalty should have been called against A&M's Michael Bennett.  Colt McCoy, in a November 2007 interview, stated that neither this nor the earlier Heard tackle had been cheap shots.

Following the injury to McCoy, back-up quarterback Jevan Snead threw an interception on his first play of the game.  With the clock rolling on the change of possession, time expired without the Aggies needing to take a play.

The Aggies amassed 244 rushing yards against the nation's top-ranked rushing defense.  Texas, normally a potent running team, produced only four rushing first downs and did not have a single run longer than nine yards (8 m).  Jamaal Charles, in a later interview, stated "We were looking weak.  We thought they'd let up because we're Texas."
The 12–7 victory was the first time for the Aggies to win in Austin in 12 years.  "They shattered all our dreams," declared Longhorn defensive end Brian Orakpo.
The game was the 40th consecutive home sell-out for the Longhorns and Justin Blalock became the first player in Texas history to start 50 consecutive game.

Pacific Life Holiday Bowl – California

The 2006 Pacific Life Holiday Bowl was the Aggies' first bowl game since the 2004 SBC Cotton Bowl. This was Dennis Franchione's second bowl appearance in his four years of coaching at Texas A&M. The game in sunny San Diego, California began with Stephen McGee hooking up with Chad Schoeder for a 14-yard TD, but it was all California from then on out. Marshawn Lynch, DeSean Jackson, and Nate Longshore ripped the Aggie defense for 31 points in the second half.

References

Texas AandM
Texas A&M Aggies football seasons
Texas AandM Aggies football